Younes Mazhoud (born 29 November 1991) is a retired Tunisian football midfielder.

References

1991 births
Living people
Tunisian footballers
AS Gabès players
Club Africain players
Association football midfielders
Tunisian Ligue Professionnelle 1 players